Manoao   is a monotypic genus in the family Podocarpaceae. The single species, M. colensoi, known as manoao (Māori), silver pine, Westland pine, or white silver pine, is endemic to New Zealand. Before 1996 it was classified in genus Dacrydium or Lagarostrobos, but has recently been recognised as a distinct genus; some botanists still treat it in Lagarostrobos on the basis that it is not phylogenetically distinct from that genus. In molecular phylogenetic analyses Manoao was found to be related to Parasitaxus (a parasitic and monotypic genus from New Caledonia) and Lagarostrobos (a single species from Tasmania when narrowly defined), but their exact relationships are unresolved.

It is a source of fine, straight and durable timber.

Distribution 
M. colensoi can be found in the North Island from Te Paki southwards to Mt Ruapehu. However it is common only in the central North Island. It is also found in the western South Island.

References

Trees of New Zealand
Trees of mild maritime climate
Least concern plants
Monotypic conifer genera
Podocarpaceae genera
Podocarpaceae
Taxa named by Brian Molloy (botanist)
Endemic flora of New Zealand